The British Accounting Review is an academic journal of the British Accounting and Finance Association that was established in 1969. Serving its purpose to educate and connect users, the British Accounting Review helps uphold the mission of the British Accounting and Finance Association.

Even though the journal was founded in the UK, the academic journal accepts UK and non-UK sourced research, reflecting the multinational users of the academic journal. Besides the British Accounting and Finance Association, creditable accounting agencies, like the American Accounting Association, use the British Accounting Review. The journal is freely accessible and can include anything relating to the widespread areas of accounting or finance, such as internal management or audit quality. Some of the most cited articles from the academic journal discuss balance scorecard trends and capital accounting and debate. Multiple research methodologies are accepted, from analytical to survey.

Before articles are published in the journal they must go through an editorial process that includes a double blind review to check for quality and integrity. Its current editors are Nathan L. Joseph and Alan Lowe of Aston Business School.

References

External links
British Accounting Review

Accounting
Publications established in 1969
Elsevier academic journals